The University of the Philippines is the national university of the Philippines. It is a public university system that is composed of constituent universities and basic education schools:

Constituent universities
 University of the Philippines Baguio
 University of the Philippines Cebu
 University of the Philippines Diliman (flagship)
 University of the Philippines Los Baños
 University of the Philippines Manila
 University of the Philippines Mindanao
 University of the Philippines Open University
 University of the Philippines Visayas

Basic education schools
 University of the Philippines High School Cebu
 University of the Philippines High School in Iloilo
 University of the Philippines Integrated School
 University of the Philippines Rural High School

See also